Food and Drink is a British television series on BBC Two. First broadcast between 1982 and 2002, it was the first national television programme in the UK to cover the subject of food and drink without cookery and recipe demonstrations.

History
The first series was presented by Simon Bates and Gillian Miles, and introduced Jilly Goolden in her first regular television appearances as the programme's wine expert.

Russell Harty presented filmed location reports from exceptional restaurants around Britain. This series featured the innovative idea of a small contributing audience of 20 people who were called "tasters and testers". The first series broadcast in the summer months but drew an average audience of 1.5 million a week, a high rating for BBC Two in the summer in the 1980s.

Later series were presented by Chris Kelly and chef Michael Barry with wine experts Jilly Goolden and Oz Clarke.

A spin-off panel game, Food and Drink Summer Quiz, aired during the main show's summer break in 1987.

Revival
Food and Drink returned to BBC Two on 4 February 2013 stylized as Food & Drink, but shown on TV as food & drink, co-hosted by Michel Roux Jr and Kate Goodman. A Christmas special aired on 18 December 2013, followed by a second series in early 2014.

A third series was broadcast in 2015. Michel Roux Jr was replaced by Tom Kerridge as main presenter whilst Kate Goodman was replaced by Joe Wadsack.

Transmissions

Original

Series

Specials

Revival

Series

Specials

References

External links

Food and Drink at BFI

1980s British cooking television series
1990s British cooking television series
2000s British cooking television series
2010s British cooking television series
1982 British television series debuts
2015 British television series endings
BBC Television shows
British cooking television shows
English-language television shows
British television series revived after cancellation
Television series by Endemol